Frank Burns may refer to:

 Frank Burns (politician), Pennsylvania politician
 Frank L. Burns (1939–2003), director of the US Army's Delta Force leadership project
 Frank R. Burns (1928–2012), head football coach at Johns Hopkins University and Rutgers University
 Alan Burns (rugby league) (born 1961), also known as Frank, Australian rugby league player 
 Frank Burns (M*A*S*H), a character on the television show M*A*S*H

See also
 Arthur Frank Burns, chairman of the Federal Reserve
 Frank Byrne (disambiguation)
 Francis Byrne (disambiguation)
 Francis Burns (disambiguation)